"Good Friends, Good Whiskey, Good Lovin'" is a song written and recorded by American country music artist Hank Williams Jr. It was released in May 1990 as the second single from his album Lone Wolf. The song peaked at number 10 on the Billboard Hot Country Singles chart and peaked at number 16 on the Canadian RPM Country Tracks chart. This was Williams' last Top 10 hit.

Chart performance

References

1990 singles
1990 songs
Hank Williams Jr. songs
Songs written by Hank Williams Jr.
Song recordings produced by Barry Beckett
Song recordings produced by Jim Ed Norman
Warner Records singles
Curb Records singles